Chandi Wickramasinghe (born 27 March 1983) is a Sri Lankan cricketer.

References

1983 births
Living people
Sri Lankan women cricketers
Sri Lanka women One Day International cricketers
Sri Lanka women Twenty20 International cricketers
People from North Central Province, Sri Lanka